Scram! is a 1932 pre-Code Laurel and Hardy film produced by Hal Roach, directed by Ray McCarey, and distributed by Metro-Goldwyn-Mayer.

Plot 
The story begins in a courtroom, where Stan and Ollie appear before Judge Beaumont on a charge of vagrancy. The duo quickly anger the judge, who can't remand them in custody for 180 days as he would normally do because the jail is full; and so instead gives them "One hour... to get out of town! And never let me set eyes on you again..." — dismissing the case by snarling "Scram! Or I'll build a jail for you!"

Later, as Stan and Ollie are walking down the sidewalk in a heavy rainstorm, they meet a well-dressed, highly intoxicated man and help retrieve his car key, which he has dropped down a grating, and in return he invites the homeless pair to stay at his mansion. Once they arrive at the residence, the congenial drunk cannot find his house key, but the boys finally get into the house, where they startle a young woman, causing her to faint. They revive her with what they think is water, but is actually gin, and all three get tipsy in the process. While the three enjoy music and dancing in the woman's bedroom, the drunk in the hallway learns from the butler that he is in the wrong house, so he staggers away to find his real home. Soon the mansion's true owner arrives: it is Judge Beaumont. Finding Stan and Ollie upstairs with his drunk wife and wearing his pajamas, the enraged judge ominously advances toward Stan and Ollie, who hurriedly retreat to a corner of the bedroom. In a panic, Stan switches off the lights — and the film ends in darkness with Judge Beaumont's wrath conveyed via a soundtrack of breaking glass, screams, whirlwinds, and explosions!

Cast
 Stan Laurel as Mr. Laurel
 Oliver Hardy as Mr. Hardy
 Richard Cramer as Judge Beaumont
 Arthur Housman as Drunk
 Vivien Oakland as Mrs. Beaumont

Controversy
According to the book Laurel & Hardy Compleet by Dutch author and Laurel and Hardy specialist Thomas Leeflang, this film was banned in the Netherlands in 1932. Moral crusaders thought the scene in which Stan and Ollie lie on a bed with a woman was indecent. Today the ban is no longer in effect.

Preservation 
Scram! was preserved and restored by the UCLA Film and Television Archive from the nitrate original picture negative, a nitrate lavender master and the nitrate original track negative. The restoration premiered at the UCLA Festival of Preservation in 2022.

References

External links 
 
 
 
 

1932 films
1932 comedy films
American black-and-white films
Films directed by Ray McCarey
Laurel and Hardy (film series)
Metro-Goldwyn-Mayer short films
Films with screenplays by H. M. Walker
1932 short films
Censorship in the Netherlands
Film controversies in the Netherlands
American comedy short films
1930s English-language films
1930s American films